A grant of arms or a governmental issuance of arms are actions, by a lawful authority such as an officer of arms or State Herald, conferring on a person and his or her descendants the right to bear a particular coat of arms or armorial bearings. It is one of the ways in which a person may lawfully bear arms in a jurisdiction regulating heraldry, another being by birth, through inheritance.

Historically a grant of arms is distinguished from both a confirmation of arms and a private registration of arms. A grant of arms confers a new right, whereas a confirmation of arms confirms an existing right; and a private registration of arms is a record which does not purport to create or confirm any legal right. However a governmental registration of arms by an official government agency, (e.g., Bureau of Heraldry in South Africa) does create and confirm new legal rights. 
The College of Arms issues "letters patent" the Bureau of Heraldry issues "certificates of registration". For all intents and purposes it's the same thing. The College of Arms "grants" in the name of the monarch and in South Africa under the Heraldry Act (1962) the certificate is "issued". In both cases the heraldic representation so issued and recorded affords the applicant sole ownership of the unique design. 
Marcel van Rossum, OMBB
Deputy Director
Bureau of Heraldry

A grant of arms or government registration of arms are typically contained in letters patent which provide self-contained proof, upon production of the letters patent, of the right conferred.  A modern English grant of arms, for example, from officers of the College of Arms in London, will begin with the words "To all and singular to whom these presents shall come...", thereby showing that it is addressed to anyone in the world to whom it may be presented.

See also
Law of Arms
King of Arms
Officer of Arms

References
 G.D. Squibb, The High Court of Chivalry p. 184 (Oxford 1959).

Heraldry
Heraldry and law